Nigel Johnson (born 23 June 1964) is an English former footballer who played in the Football League for Rotherham United and Manchester City.

External links
 Nigel Johnson stats at Neil Brown stat site

English footballers
English Football League players
1964 births
Living people
Rotherham United F.C. players
Manchester City F.C. players
Association football defenders